Edwin Whitfield Fay (January 1, 1865, Minden, Louisiana - February 17, 1920, Pittsburgh, Pennsylvania) was a United States philologist.

Biography
He graduated from Southwestern Presbyterian University in 1883, received the degree of Ph.D. at Johns Hopkins University in 1890, and studied at the University of Leipzig in 1891–92. In 1890-91 he was instructor in Sanskrit and classics at the University of Michigan, in 1892-93 he was acting associate professor of Latin at the University of Texas, in 1893-99 professor of Latin at Washington and Lee College, and beginning 1899 professor of Latin at the University of Texas until his death in Pittsburgh while visiting his sister.

Works

 A History of Education in Louisiana (1898)
 The Treatment of Rig-Veda Mantras in the Yrhya Sutras (1899)
 T. Macci Planti Mostellaria (1902)
He also published works in journals, mostly academic, but some popular.

Notes

References

External links
 

1865 births
1920 deaths
American philologists
Rhodes College alumni
Johns Hopkins University alumni
University of Texas faculty
Washington and Lee University faculty
University of Michigan faculty